Gulbrand Alhaug (born July 2, 1942) is a Norwegian onomastician and linguistics professor emeritus at the University of Tromsø. 

Alhaug studied at the University of Bergen. He has studied personal names in particular, and published the volume Norsk fornavnleksikon (Dictionary of Norwegian Given Names, 2011). In addition to Norwegian names, his onomastic studies have also included the Pomaks of Bulgaria.

Selected bibliography
 En datamaskinell undersøkelse av suffiksvekslingen -ing/-ning i moderne norsk (A Computational Study of the Suffix Alternation -ing/-ning in Modern Norwegian; 1973)
 Heiderskrift til Nils Hallan på 65-årsdagen 13. desember 1991 (A Festschrift for Nisl Hallan on His Sixty-Fifth Birthday, December 13, 1991; 1991)
 Nordisk namnforskning 1997 (Nordic Onomastics 1997; 1998)
 10 001 navn : norsk fornavnleksikon (10,001 Names: Dictionary of Norwegian Given Names; 2001)
 Venneskrift til Gulbrand Alhaug (Papers in Honor of Gulbrand Alhaug; 2002)
 Fornamn i Noreg frå 1900 til 1975: med vekt på endringar i namnemønsteret (Given Names in Norway, 1900–1975: With an Emphasis on Changes in Name Patterns; 2004)
 Mot rikare mål å trå: festskrift til Tove Bull (Aspiring to Higher Things. A Festschrift for Tove Bull; 2005)
 Norsk fornavnleksikon (Dictionary of Norwegian Given Names; 2011)

References

External links
BIBSYS: Publications by Gulbrand Alhaug
University of Tromsø faculty homepage: Gulbrand Alhaug

1942 births
Living people
Linguists from Norway
University of Bergen alumni
Academic staff of the University of Tromsø